Ash Vale is a railway station serving the village of Ash Vale in Surrey, England. The station and all trains serving it are operated by South Western Railway and Great Western Railway Great Western Railway (train operating company)

The station is on an embankment and is adjacent to the Basingstoke Canal. The station opened in May 1870 under the name of "North Camp and Ash Vale", changing to its present name on 30 March 1924. The original main station building of the south side had to be demolished due to subsidence, the current replacements dating from 1972.

It is approximately half a mile from Ash Vale to North Camp station on the North Downs Line (the line between Gatwick Airport, Guildford and Reading), a distance passengers are expected to walk to make any connection. Only disabled passengers may argue that to do so would not be "reasonable" - the National Routeing Guide which defines route validity allows for the less able taking circuitous routes at the discretion of staff.

History

Opened by the London and South Western Railway, it became part of the Southern Railway during the Grouping of 1923. The station then passed on to the Southern Region of British Railways on nationalisation in 1948.

When Sectorisation was introduced in the 1980s, the station was served by Network SouthEast until the Privatisation of British Railways.

In 1952 the booking clerk at Ash Vale was murdered following a hold-up by a fellow rail worker.

Services
On weekdays, there are trains approximately every 30 minutes between London Waterloo and Alton and between Ascot and Aldershot. On Sundays, trains run every 30 minutes between London and Alton and every 60 minutes between Ascot and Guildford.

Train movements in the Ash Vale station area and the junction beyond were controlled by Ash Vale Junction signal box. The signal box, complete with its four residents and cover staff, operated 24 hours a day 364 days a year from a traditional signal box on the junction itself.  The signal box closed in 2014 and has since been removed.

Passengers awaiting services at Ash Vale towards London or Ascot can check the route of the train by referring to the signal at the end of platform 1. If the five white directional lights are illuminated, then the train is going towards Ascot; whereas if they are not, then the train is going towards Woking. (A red light means the train is not going anywhere at the moment.)

Gallery

Notes

References

External links

Railway stations in Surrey
DfT Category D stations
Former London and South Western Railway stations
Railway stations in Great Britain opened in 1870
Railway stations served by South Western Railway